Sleigh Bells is an American animated short film featuring Oswald the Lucky Rabbit. It was directed by Walt Disney and Ub Iwerks, and released in 1927 by Universal Pictures. The film was thought to be lost until a print was discovered in the BFI National Archives in 2015.

Plot
The film has Oswald the Lucky Rabbit playing in an ice hockey game with surreal plot points. With a "winter wonderland backdrop", Oswald takes off his ear to form a balloon plus a laughing donkey, who gets the puck in the mouth which sticks.

History
The short was animated by Walt Disney and Ub Iwerks and was released in 1927. The found footage of film was dated 1931 at a Soho film laboratory. That lab went out of business with its film being sent to the BFI archives in 1981. A lost Disney titles researcher searched through the BFI archive catalog and found its listing. The short was returned to Disney and has since been restored by the Walt Disney Animation Studios. On December 12, 2015, Sleigh Bells was featured in It’s a Disney Christmas: Seasonal Shorts program at BFI Southbank.

Seasonal Shorts
It’s a Disney Christmas: Seasonal Shorts featured:
 Sleigh Bells (1928)
 Mickey's Good Deed (1932)
 Night Before Christmas (1933)
 The Art of Skiing (1941)
 Pluto's Christmas Tree (1952)
 Mickey's Christmas Carol (1983)
 Prep and Landing: Operation Secret Santa (2010)
 Frozen Fever (2015)

See also
 List of rediscovered films

References

External links
 
 

1927 comedy films
1927 films
1927 animated films
1920s rediscovered films
1920s American animated films
American black-and-white films
American silent short films
Oswald the Lucky Rabbit cartoons
Films directed by Walt Disney
Films directed by Ub Iwerks
1920s Disney animated short films
American Christmas films
Universal Pictures short films
Universal Pictures animated short films
Animated films about animals
Rediscovered American films
Silent American comedy films